The Undergrowth of Literature is a pioneering study of pornography written by the British author Gillian Freeman in 1967.  The foreword is by David Stafford-Clark.  A review by Stephen Vizinczey described it as 'nothing more than a collection of quotes, précis, paraphrases and photographs from current pornographic publications and glossy magazines ... there is no love like the liberal prig's love for perverts and perversions'.

References

1967 non-fiction books
Pornography
British non-fiction books
Thomas Nelson (publisher) books